Ross Herald of Arms Extraordinary is a Scottish herald of arms Extraordinary of the Court of the Lord Lyon. The office is however held in Extraordinary after the retirement of the last holder in Ordinary.

The title of the office is derived from the Earldom of Ross. The title was first used in 1475.

The Ross Herald in 1687, Henry Fraser was a heraldic painter who apprenticed under George Porteous. He was responsible for genealogical research and the designing and painting of coats of arms. There is mention of him in the Gordon papers of 24 December 1716 "Account due to Henry Fraser, Ross Herald, for paintings done for funeral of George, 1st duke of Gordon: lozenge arms, mort heads, branches for the coffin, a helmet and ducal crown, etc., and other work in the Citadel of Leith."  He was also mentioned by Alexander Nisbet in his book A System of Heraldry, Speculative & Practical written in 1712 but not published until 1722 in Edinburgh.  "James Workman's Illuminated Book of Arms, who was Herald in the reign of James VI, which book I frequently refer to... which book I had from the ingenious Mr. Henry Fraser, Ross Herald...."  Mr. Fraser died 15 January 1724 and is buried b. 17 North Corner Naismith Tomb in Greyfriars Churchyard. The office was held until his death.

The badge of office is Two lions rampant Argent armed and langued Azure supporting a baton paleways Sable, the tips Or ensigned of the Crown of Scotland Proper.

The office is currently vacant.

Holders of the office

See also
Officer of Arms
Herald
Court of the Lord Lyon
Heraldry Society of Scotland

References

External links
The Court of the Lord Lyon



Court of the Lord Lyon
Offices of arms